"Alma Matters" is a song by Morrissey, released as a single in July 1997. It was the first single to be taken from the Maladjusted album and was released one week before the album.

The single reached number 16 on the UK Singles Chart, becoming Morrissey's first top 20 hit since "The More You Ignore Me, the Closer I Get" in 1994. The song was also notable for seeing Morrissey reference the film A Taste of Honey for the first time since his early days in The Smiths in the line "it's my life to ruin my own way".

The song title is a pun on Alma mater.

Track listings

7" vinyl and cassette (UK)
 "Alma Matters" (Morrissey/Alain Whyte)
 "Heir Apparent" (Morrissey/Whyte)

12" vinyl and CD
 "Alma Matters"
 "Heir Apparent"
 "I Can Have Both" (Morrissey/Boz Boorer)

Reviews
Jack Rabid of AllMusic called this single "ho-hum", saying it was "a poor choice to represent Maladjusted". He also criticized guitarists Boz Boorer and Alain Whyte, asking when Morrissey was going to part company with them, and declared the B-sides "Heir Apparent" and "I Can Have Both" to be the better songs but still lacking in comparison to previous B-sides "Whatever Happens, I Love You" and "Nobody Loves Us". Rabid concludes his review, writing "Morrissey is a major talent with a special voice atrophying in underwhelming material and backing. To quote Joy Division, 'When will it end?'" Keith Phipps of The A.V. Club, however, listed the song as a highlight of Maladjusted.

In a 2009 article Uncut described the song as 'Morrissey's worst single'.

Spins list of '50 Best Morrissey Songs' from 2017 includes "Alma Matters" as his 12th best solo song.

Personnel
 Morrissey – voice
 Martin "Boz" Boorer – guitar
 Alain Whyte – guitar
 Jonny Bridgwood – bass
 Spencer James Cobrin – drums

Charts

References

1997 singles
Morrissey songs
Music videos directed by Matthew Rolston
Songs written by Morrissey
Song recordings produced by Steve Lillywhite
1997 songs
Island Records singles
Songs written by Alain Whyte